Code of Silence is a 2014 Australian documentary film of the life of Manny Waks and his Chabad Hasidic family who struggle in the aftermath of Waks' public disclosure of the sexual abuse he endured during his school years. The documentary was directed by filmmaker Danny Ben-Moshe and aired on the ABC Australian television channel.

See also 
 Welcome to the Waks Family
 One of Us (2017 film)

References 

Films about Orthodox and Hasidic Jews
2014 documentary films
Films about Chabad